Jéhan Le Roy (5 November 1923 – 17 August 1992) was a French equestrian, born in Dieppe. He won a bronze medal in team eventing (also known as horse trials) at the 1960 Summer Olympics in Rome, together with Guy Lefrant and Jack le Goff.

References

External links
 

1923 births
1992 deaths
French male equestrians
Olympic equestrians of France
Olympic bronze medalists for France
Equestrians at the 1960 Summer Olympics
Equestrians at the 1964 Summer Olympics
Olympic medalists in equestrian
Medalists at the 1960 Summer Olympics